Wyndham R. "Windy" White Jr. was a college football player. He was a fullback for the VMI Keydets in the 1920s. He was selected All-Southern in 1923. He also played basketball. He is in the VMI Hall of Fame.

References

American football fullbacks
American football punters
VMI Keydets football players
All-Southern college football players
VMI Keydets basketball players
American men's basketball players